Gran Hermano VIP 2 was the second season of the reality television Gran Hermano VIP series  which was broadcast in Spain on Telecinco and La Siete and produced by Endemol. The show lasted 71 days from January 6, 2005 to March 17, 2005. Ivonne Armant emerged as the winner.

Housemates

Nominations table
Housemates are split into two teams.
Team One: Adans, Isabel, Jacqueline, Kiko, Lalo and Rosario.
Team Two: Adi, Brito, Ivonne, King, Lara, Martin, and later late-arrival Tontxu.

Each Week, when the Housemates Nominate, they must choose one Housemate from each team - with the Housemate from Team One they choose shown in the top of the box and the Housemate they choose from Team Two shown in the bottom of the box, with the three or more Housemates with the most Nomination Points facing the Public Vote.

Notes
Each Week the team captains have the chance to save one Housemate from the line-up, provided they agree.
 Brito was initially Nominated but was saved by the team captains, being replaced by Jacqueline and Rosario.
 Adi, Brito and Kiko were originally Nominated for Eviction (with the team captains choosing to save no-one) but after Kiko Walked from the House he was replaced in the Nomination line-up by Martín.
 Brito, Ivonne, Martin and Rosario were originally Nominated, but Brito was saved by the team captains.
 This Week Rosario switched from Team 1 to Team 2, in order to even out the disproportionate numbers.
 From this Week on the teams were kept - but Housemates could now Nominate whoever they wanted (as opposed to one from each team). The team captains chose to save no-one this Week and so the Nominations stayed the same.

See also
Main Article about the show
http://www.tv-gossip.com/wiki/Gran_Hermano_%28Spain%29

Gran Hermano (Spanish TV series) seasons
2005 Spanish television seasons